Great Britain, represented by the British Olympic Association (BOA), competed at the 1912 Summer Olympics in Stockholm, Sweden. 274 competitors, 264 men and 10 women, took part in 79 events in 16 sports. British athletes won ten gold medals and 41 medals overall, finishing third.

Medallists

Aquatics

Diving

Three divers, including one woman, represented Great Britain. The inclusion of Isabelle White on the British team made Great Britain one of three nations (along with Austria and host Sweden to send a woman to the first Olympic diving competition open to women.

It was Great Britain's second appearance in diving. White was the only diver to win a medal for the nation, giving Great Britain its first diving medal. Each of the men advanced to the final in one event, but were unable to finish in the top three.

Rankings given are within the diver's heat.

Swimming

18 swimmers, including six women, competed for Great Britain at the 1912 Games. It was the third time the nation had competed in swimming.

The British women won the gold medal in the relay event, with Fletcher adding a bronze in the women's individual race. The men took a total of four medals, two silver and two bronze, with both silvers coming from Hatfield.

Ranks given for each swimmer are within the heat.

 Men

 Women

Water polo

Great Britain made its third appearance in Olympic water polo in 1912. The British squad had won the gold medal in both of its prior appearances, in 1908 and 1900. They remained true to form, winning all three matches in 1912 to take their third gold medal. The toughest match of the tournament for the British side was the first one, against a Belgium team that Great Britain needed extra time to defeat. The luck of the draw was that the matches got easier from there, with the British team beating Sweden 6–3 in the semifinals and Austria 8–0 in the final.

 Quarterfinals

 Semifinals

 Final

Athletics

65 athletes represented Great Britain. It was the fifth appearance of the nation in athletics, which Great Britain had competed in at each Games. The team finished with two gold medals, one silver, and five bronzes.

Ranks given are within that athlete's heat for running events.

Cycling

Twenty-six cyclists represented Great Britain; 24 of the 26 finished the race. It was the third appearance of the nation in cycling. Frederick Grubb had the best time in the time trial, the only race held, winning the silver medal. For the team competition, Great Britain was allowed to have each Home Nation compete separately and entered teams representing England, Scotland, and Ireland. Grubb, along with the next three fastest English cyclists, had a combined time that won another silver medal. The Scottish cyclists placed fourth, with the Irish finishing 11th.

Road cycling

Equestrian

 Eventing
(The maximum score in each of the five events was 10.00 points. Ranks given are for the cumulative score after each event. Team score is the sum of the top three individual scores.)

 Jumping

Fencing

Twenty-two fencers represented Great Britain. It was the third appearance of the nation in fencing. The British épée team, defending silver medalists, again took second place with four of the six 1908 team members returning. One member of that team, Seligman, had the best individual placements with a pair of sixth-place finishes. Two other Britons advanced to the finals, each taking eighth place.

Football

Quarterfinals

Semifinals

Gold medal match

Final rank

Gymnastics

Twenty-three gymnasts represented Great Britain. It was the fourth appearance of the nation in gymnastics, in which Great Britain had not competed only in 1904. The nation sent a team in one of the three team competitions, winning a bronze medal.

Artistic

Modern pentathlon 

Great Britain had three competitors in the first Olympic pentathlon competition. Two of the British pentathletes finished in the top ten.

(The scoring system was point-for-place in each of the five events, with the smallest point total winning.)

Rowing 

Twenty four rowers represented Great Britain. It was the nation's third appearance in rowing. Britain was nearly as dominant in the sport as they had been four years earlier, winning two of the three events British rowers entered and placing all four boats in the finals. The only British loss, other than in the Britain-only eights final, came in the coxed fours as the British boat took silver after coming in second to a German boat in the final. In all, Great Britain took two gold medals and two silvers; the best possible finish would have been three golds and one silver.

(Ranks given are within each crew's heat.)

Shooting 

Thirty-eight shooters competed for Great Britain. It was the nation's fourth appearance in shooting. The British team won a total of nine medals, including one gold. Six of the nation's medals came in team events; the Britons won a medal in each team event in which they competed.

Tennis 

Eleven tennis players, including three women, represented Great Britain at the 1912 Games. It was the nation's fourth appearance in tennis, having missed only 1904.

The British men started strong, advancing four of the eight individuals to the indoor singles quarterfinals and three of the four pairs to the same level (with none facing each other, no less). Dixon's semifinal win was the only one garnered by the men, however, and the team gathered only his silver medal and a bronze by Dixon and Beamish in the doubles. The women fared better, with Hannam and Parton meeting in the semifinals before taking the gold and silver medals, respectively, in the indoor singles. Great Britain's best results, however, came in the mixed pairs—the only losses by British mixed pairs were to other British sides. The layout of the draw resulted in gold and silver medals and a fifth-place finish for the three pairs.

 Men

 Women

 Mixed

Tug of war 

Britain competed in Olympic tug of war for the second time. The reigning champions, the City of London Police, were one of only two teams to compete. The eight-man team included three members of the 1908 squad. They challenged the host Stockholm Police in a best-of-three match. The Londoners were pulled across the line in the first pull, then gave a mighty struggle in the second. This second pull resulted in neither team being able to pull the other across, but the British team succumbed to exhaustion first as some of its members sank to the ground to give Sweden the victory.

Wrestling

Greco-Roman

Great Britain sent 12 wrestlers in its third Olympic wrestling appearance. Barrett and MacKenzie were the only two wrestlers to win any matches, taking one bout each. The team finished with an overall 2-24 record.

Art Competitions

References

External links
Official Olympic Reports
International Olympic Committee results database

Nations at the 1912 Summer Olympics
1912
Olympics
Olympics